Oskar Freysinger (born 12 June 1960) is a Swiss politician of the Swiss People's Party.

Biography 
Freysinger studied at a German-speaking school in Sion, and later studied German literature and philosophy, and French literature, obtaining a teaching degree in 1985.

Freysinger has taught at the Lycée-Collège de la Planta since 1987.

From 1997 and 2001, he was a communal counselor at Savièse for the Christian Democratic People's Party of Switzerland. In 1999, he co-founded the Valaisan branch of the Swiss People's Party, which he headed from 1999 to 2002.

Freysinger held an MP position at the cantonal parliament of Valais from 2001 to 2003, and at the National Council of Switzerland from 2003.

His main proposals include the revocation of article 261 bis; hold naturalisation by popular vote; expulsion of foreigners convicted of crimes; and strict regulation of drugs. His political creed reads

On 3 September 2011 Freysinger gave a speech decrying multiculturalism and Muslim immigration, calling it an attempted conquest, with the statement: "If we lose this battle, there will be no second chance, for Islam does not give back what it has conquered. So I summon all the humanists of this continent not to keep their heads in the sand and to resist the Islamic dogma’s drive to conquest. Let us stand together and uncompromisingly insist upon the primacy of our civil law over any religious dogma. Let us find our way back to our precious intellectual heritage. Islam is only as strong as we are weak." This speech, a film of which is available on YouTube, quickly made him an international celebrity.

Freysinger played a crucial role in the 2009 Swiss minaret referendum to ban minarets, and he participated in the 2010 counter-jihad conference in Paris. He has also been on the board of advisors of the organisation Stop Islamization of Nations (SION). He sees Islam as essentially a political religion and therefore subject to secular law. He is a member of the Association of Writers of Serbia.

Works 
 Brüchige Welten, Rotten Verlag, 2004.
 Outre-pensées, éditions de la Matze, 2005
 Schachspirale, éditions de la Matze, 2006
 Le nez dans le soleil, 2009
 "L'évasion de C.B.", fiction satirique sur le 12 décembre, 2008

Notes and references

External links 
 

Members of the National Council (Switzerland)
Swiss People's Party politicians
1960 births
Living people
Anti-Islam sentiment in Switzerland
Serbian writers
Counter-jihad activists